Amy Thiessen is a Canadian singer-songwriter from Calgary.  

Thiessen's debut full-length album was Give Up The Fight,
released in 2011.
Her second album, In Between Goodbyes (2014), was produced by Russell Broom.
In a Fast Forward Weekly review of Give Up the Fight, James Wilt wrote "Thiessen's lyrical honesty and powerful voice deserves a listen."

Thiessen is a certified Yoga instructor, which she says has influenced her music, especially her first album.

References

External links

Official website

Musicians from Calgary
Living people
Canadian women guitarists
Yoga teachers
Year of birth missing (living people)